The Universal Typeface Experiment was a promotional website funded by Société Bic, the maker of the Bic pen. The website crowdsourced a typeface with mobile users who entered their handwriting on the website using a touchpad and the then newly updated BIC pen called the Crystal Stylus, which included a touchpad-friendly rubber tip.

Though it was possible to participate using one's fingers, writing with a pen was significantly easier. Notwithstanding this difference, the website offered the contributor the opportunity to sign in and answer some demographic questions, enabling automatic aggregation of statistics about handwriting that sparked an article in the Smithsonian magazine. The downloadable font created by this averaged handwriting experiment was heavily influenced by the user prompt, whereby the user was presented with 26 capital letters in random order in the Arial font. Within the confines of this self-selection bias, regional differences were easily recognizable.

The website, hosted by Tribal DDB and developed by the Dutch ad agency MediaMonks, was originally intended as a product launch and was scheduled to be taken down in August 2014. It won the "Site of the Month"  award by the Favourite Website Awards (FWA) and was still live and accepting contributions in January 2015.

References

 The Universal Typeface Project Averages the World's Handwriting to Produce an Incredibly Average Font in Smithsonian magazine, 9 July 2014

Casual script typefaces
Defunct websites